The Cognition and Brain Sciences Unit is a branch of the UK Medical Research Council, based in Cambridge, England. The CBSU is a centre for cognitive neuroscience, with a mission to improve human health by understanding and enhancing cognition and behaviour in health, disease and disorder. It is one of the largest and most long-lasting contributors to the development of psychological theory and practice.

The CBSU has its own magnetic resonance imaging (MRI, 3T) scanner on-site, as well as a 306-channel magnetoencephalography (MEG) system and a 128-channel electroencephalography (EEG) laboratory.

The CBSU has close links to clinical neuroscience research in the University of Cambridge Medical School. Over 140 scientists, students, and support staff work in research areas such as Memory, Attention, Emotion, Speech and Language, Development and Aging, Computational Modelling and Neuroscience Methods. With dedicated facilities available on site, the Unit has particular strengths in the application of neuroimaging techniques in the context of well-developed neuro-cognitive theory.

History 

The unit was established in 1944 as the MRC Applied Psychology Unit. In June 2001, the History of Modern Biomedicine Research Group held a witness seminar to gather information on the unit's history.

On 1 July 2017, the CBU was merged with the University of Cambridge. Coming under the Clinical School, the unit is still funded by the British government through Research Councils UK but is managed and maintained by Cambridge University.

List of directors 

 Kenneth Craik, 1944–1945
 Frederic Bartlett, 1945–1951
 Norman Mackworth, 1951–1958
 Donald Broadbent, 1958–1974
 Alan Baddeley, 1974–1997
 William Marslen-Wilson, 1997–2010
 Susan Gathercole, 2011–2018
 Matthew Lambon Ralph, 2018–

References

External links
 MRC CBU Home Page

Cognitive neuroscience
Neuroscience research centres in the United Kingdom
Neuroimaging
Cognitive science research institutes
Cognitive psychology
Medical research institutes in the United Kingdom
Medical Research Council (United Kingdom)
Research institutes in Cambridge
Research institutes established in 1944
1944 establishments in the United Kingdom
Cognition and Brain Sciences Unit, MRC